Walela is a trio of singers, named for the Cherokee word for hummingbird. The group was founded in 1996 by sisters Rita Coolidge and Priscilla Coolidge, with Priscilla's daughter Laura Satterfield as the third member. Although the band name is Cherokee, none of the members of this band are enrolled or claimed by any of the three Federally recognized bands of Cherokee.

Biography
Featured as part of Robbie Robertson and the Red Road Ensemble's album Music for The Native Americans, Walela is known for their distinctive vocal blend brings. During the 1996 Atlanta Olympics, Walela performed extensively in the Olympic Park. Their 1997 debut release on Capitol Records earned them the recognition of the Nammy Awards (Native American Music Awards) where they took home the award for Debut Artist of the Year and Song of the Year for "The Warrior".

Awards
The group won the Native American Music Awards' best debut group and song of the year for 1998.

Discography

Walela (1997)
 Is Everybody Here
 Cherokee River
 Wash Your Spirit Clean
 The Warrior
 Muddy Road
 Cherokee
 Cherokee Morning Song
 Wounded Knee
 The Whippoorwill
 Circle of Light
 Earth Children
 Amazing Grace (in Cherokee)
 I’ll Turn My Radio On

Unbearable Love (2000)
 Gathering of Eagles
 The Sequence
 Cherokee Rose
 I Know I Don’t Walk on Water
 Smoke in the Wind
 Bright Morning Star
 I Have No Indian Name
 Tell Them They Lie
 When It Comes
 When Love Was All We Knew
 God Save Us from Ourselves
 Unbearable Love

Live in Concert (2004)
 The Gathering of Eagles
 Cherokee River
 Cherokee Rose
 Wash Your Spirit Clean
 I Have No Indian Name
 When It Comes
 Muddy Road
 When Love Was All We Knew
 Cherokee Morning Song
 Wounded Knee
 Tell Them They Lied
 God Save Us From Ourselves

The Best of Walela (2007)
 Is Everybody Here
 Cherokee Morning Star
 Amazing Grace
 Bright Morning Star
 Smoke In the Wind
 Wash Your Spirit Clean
 The Warrior
 Cherokee Rose
 I’ll Turn My Radio On
 I Have No Indian Name
 God Save Us From Ourselves
 When It Comes
 The Whippoorwill
 Unbearable Love

References

American girl groups
American vocal groups